North West Warriors was formed in 2013 and became a first-class team in 2017. They played their inaugural first-class match in the 2017 Inter-Provincial Championship against Northern Knights. North West Warriors have won the Interprovincial Championship once, in 2018. In total, 25 players have appeared in first-class cricket for North West Warriors, with two players having played in all 11 first-class fixtures played by North West Warriors.

William Porterfield is North West Warriors leading run-scorer in first-class cricket, aggregating 581 runs. Three batsmen have scored a century for North West Warriors in the format: Niall O'Brien, Porterfield and Stuart Thompson. Porterfield's score of 207, scored in 2018 against Leinster Lightning is the highest score by a North West Warriors batsman, and Porterfield also has the teams best batting average: 72.62. Among the bowlers, Craig Young has taken more wickets than any other, claiming 37 – six wickets more than that of the second most prolific bowler, David Scanlon. Scanlon also has the best bowling figures in an innings: he claimed five wickets against Northern Knights in a 2017 match, while conceding 29 runs. O'Brien has kept wicket in six of North West Warriors 11 first-class matches, taking 14 catches.

Players are initially listed in order of appearance; where players made their debut in the same match, they are initially listed by batting order.

Key

List of first-class cricketers

See also
List of North West Warriors List A players
List of North West Warriors Twenty20 players
List of Irish first-class cricketers

References

North West Warriors
Cricketers, first class